Kalleh Jub (also Romanized as Kalleh Jūb; also known as Kaleh Chūb, Khaluju, Koleh Jūb-e Bālā, and Koleh Jūb-e ‘Olyā) is a village in Qaedrahmat Rural District, Zagheh District, Khorramabad County, Lorestan Province, Iran. At the 2006 census, its population was 851, in 180 families.

References 

Towns and villages in Khorramabad County